The 2008–09 Los Angeles Kings season was the 42nd season (41st season of play) for the National Hockey League franchise.  The Kings showed improvement while fielding the youngest team in the league (in terms of average age per player), but came up short of breaking a playoff drought that stretches back to the 2001–02 season.

Despite a tough schedule that saw them play 17 of their final 24 games away from the Staples Center, the Kings managed to stay in the playoff hunt for much of the year. They played in 43 games decided by one goal, and their record in these games was 20–12–11.

Alexander Frolov led the team in goals with 32, his fifth-consecutive season with at least 20 or more goals. The last King to post five consecutive season with over 20 goals was Luc Robitaille in the 1993–94 season. Moreover, defenseman Sean O'Donnell reached a milestone by playing in his 1,000th career NHL game on March 14.

Pre-season
On June 10, the Kings fired Head Coach Marc Crawford after failing to make the post-season in back-to-back seasons. Crawford posted a 59–84–21 record during his tenure. He was replaced on July 17 by Terry Murray, who takes over his fourth NHL team. Murray had previously coached the Washington Capitals, Florida Panthers and Philadelphia Flyers, where he led the latter to the 1997 Stanley Cup Finals. Entering the season, Murray's career record is 360–288–89.

Regular season
The Kings made great strides in the 2008–09 season. They went from 30th in the NHL a year prior in penalty killing to seventh-best in the league, with an 82.9% rating. They had the League's fourth-best faceoff win percentage and allowed the fourth-fewest shots on goal. Five players played in all 82 regular games: Anze Kopitar, Michal Handzus, Matt Greene, Sean O'Donnell and rookie Wayne Simmonds. Several surprises also emerged during the season.

Kyle Quincey was acquired via waivers shortly after season started from the Detroit Red Wings, necessitated by an injury to defenseman Jack Johnson. Quincey went on to finish second in the team in assists and averaged over 20 minutes of ice time per game. Drew Doughty, the second overall pick in the 2008 NHL Entry Draft, immediately contributed to the team, leading the Kings in ice time and was second in blocked shots. He finished in the top ten in the NHL in several categories, and was considered a strong Calder Memorial Trophy candidate for Rookie of the Year honors.

Another surprise was Jonathan Quick, who emerged as the team's number one goaltender. Quick was thrust into the line-up following the trade of Jason LaBarbera in mid-season to the Vancouver Canucks and due to an injury to Erik Ersberg. All Quick lead the team in every goaltending category, posting the third highest win total for a rookie in Kings history. He finished third in the league among rookie netminder in goals against average, and played in 22 of the final 27 and 41 of the final 52 Kings games  He had a 1.76 goals-against average (16 GA in 546:03) and .942 save percentage (258 saves in 274 shots) in nine straight appearances from March 22 to April 9.

The Kings finished the regular season having been shut out 12 times, tying the Colorado Avalanche for the most times shut out.

The Western Conference remained a tight race throughout the season, and the Kings were not officially eliminated from the playoffs until two weeks remained in the season.

Divisional standings

Conference standings

Schedule and results

Playoffs
The Los Angeles Kings failed to qualify for the playoffs for the sixth consecutive season.

Player statistics

Skaters

Goaltenders

†Denotes player spent time with another team before joining Kings. Stats reflect time with the Kings only.
‡Traded mid-season
Bold/italics denotes franchise record

Awards and records

Records

Milestones

Transactions

Trades

 Pick later traded to Carolina Hurricanes.
 Pick later traded to Phoenix Coyotes.
 Pick later traded to Calgary Flames.
 Pick later traded to Florida Panthers (then to Minnesota Wild).
 Condition not satisfied.

Free agents

Waivers

Other

Draft picks
LA 's picks at the 2008 NHL Entry Draft in Ottawa, Ontario.

See also
2008–09 NHL season

Farm teams
The Kings have one American Hockey League affiliate in the Manchester Monarchs. They also have two ECHL affiliates in the Ontario Reign and Reading Royals. All three are owned in part by the Kings' parent company Anschutz Entertainment Group.

References

Los Angeles Kings seasons
Los Angeles Kings season, 2008-09
Los
LA Kings
LA Kings